Marsa Street is a road located in Warsaw, Poland.

It is the main road from the center and eastern part of the city towards Sulejówek, Okuniew, Liw and Węgrów, as well as Nieporęt, Zegrze and Nowy Dwór Mazowiecki. It crosses the railway tracks twice and ends at the Warszawa Rembertów railway station. Most of the street runs through a wooded area of the Kawęczyn nature reserve and the Rembertów Forest. In the part from Ignacy Mościcki Roundabout to Rekrucka Street it is a dual carriageway, and then to Cyrulików Street is a single-carriageway with one lane in each direction.

Streets in Warsaw